Rock and roll is a genre of popular music that originated and evolved in the United States during the late 1940s and early 1950s.

Rock and roll or Rock n' roll may also refer to:

Music
 Rock music or rock & roll, a broader musical genre that includes a range of styles that evolved from rock and roll 
 Rock&Roll (band), a French indie rock band
 Rock 'n Roll Records, an American record label

Albums
 Rock and Roll (Beyond album)
 Rock'n Roll (Dread Zeppelin album)
 Rock 'n' Roll (Elvis Presley album), UK title of Elvis Presley
 Rock 'n' Roll (John Lennon album)
 Rock and Roll (The Mark of Cain album)
 Rock 'n' Roll (Motörhead album)
 Rock'n Roll (New York Dolls album)
 Rock 'n' Roll (Potshot album)
 Rock n Roll (Ryan Adams album)
 Rock & Roll (Vanilla Fudge album)
 Rock and Roll: An Introduction to The Velvet Underground
 Rock 'n' Roll Music (album), by The Beatles
 Foghat (1973 album), also known as Rock and Roll
 Rock & Roll (EP), an EP by Frank Turner
 Rock 'n' Roll (Buckcherry album)

Songs
 "Rock n Roll" (Avril Lavigne song)
 "Rock and Roll" (Eric Hutchinson song)
 "Rock and Roll" (Gary Glitter song)
 "Rock and Roll" (Led Zeppelin song)
 "Rock 'n' Roll" (Status Quo song)
 "Rock & Roll" (The Velvet Underground song)
 "Rock and Roll (I Gave You the Best Years of My Life)", by Kevin Johnson, covered by Mac Davis
 "Rock and Roll Music" (song), by Chuck Berry, covered by The Beatles
 "Rock and Roll", by The Boswell Sisters for the 1934 film Transatlantic Merry-Go-Round
 "Rock'n Roll", by Daft Punk from Homework
 "Rock and Roll", by Edan from Beauty and the Beat
 "rock + roll", by EDEN from i think you think too much of me
 "Rock & Roll", by Dio from Killing the Dragon
 “Rock and Roll”, by Johnny Winter from Still Alive and Well
 "Rock N Roll", by Ken Carson from Project X
 "Rock 'n' Roll", by Krokus from One Vice at a Time
 "Rock N Roll", by Remi Nicole from My Conscience and I
 "Rock n Roll", by Pusha T from It's Almost Dry
 "Rock n' Roll (Will Take You to the Mountain)", by Skrillex

Film and television
 Rock'n'Roll (1959 film), a 1959 Australian documentary film
 Rock & Roll (2007 film), a 2007 Malayalam film directed by Renjith
 Rock'n Roll (2017 film), a 2017 French film
 Rock & Roll (TV series), a 1995 television documentary series (aka "Dancing in the Street") co-produced for PBS and the BBC

Other uses
 Rock 'n' Roll (play), a play by Tom Stoppard
 Rock 'n' Roll (video game), a 1989 game for 8- and 16-bit systems
 Rock and Roll (dance), a competitive form of dance
 Rock 'n Roll (G.I. Joe), a fictional character in the G.I. Joe universe
 Rocking and rolling, a name for cueing techniques in sound and video recording
 Rock 'n Roll (pinball), a 1970 pinball machine by Williams
 17058 Rocknroll, an asteroid in the Main Belt
 Rock 'n' Roll, a story of The Railway Series book "The Little Old Engine"

See also
 Rock-A-Rolla, a music magazine
 Rocka Rolla, an album by Judas Priest
 RocknRolla, a 2008 British crime film directed by Guy Ritchie
 Rock 'n' Roll High School (disambiguation)